William Atcheson Stewart (February 26, 1915 – December 8, 1990) was a politician in Ontario, Canada. He was a Progressive Conservative member of the Legislative Assembly of Ontario from 1957 to 1975 who represented the southwestern Ontario riding of Middlesex North. He served as a cabinet minister in the governments of Leslie Frost, John Robarts, and Bill Davis.

Background
Stewart was a cattle farmer in Denfield, Ontario. He married Edythe Jones and together they raised four daughters.

Politics
In 1957, Stewart was elected in a by-election in the riding of Middlesex North to replace Thomas L. Patrick who had died that year. He defeated Liberal candidate A.E. Smith by 3,134 votes. He was re-elected in 1959, 1963, 1967, and 1971. In 1960, Leslie Frost appointed him to cabinet as a Minister Without Portfolio. In 1961 he was appointed by new Premier, John Robarts as Minister of Agriculture. He retained the cabinet position for 15 years until his retirement in 1975.

Cabinet positions

Later life
In 1983, he was appointed the fourth chancellor of the University of Guelph. In 1976, he was awarded an honorary LL.D. from the University of Guelph. He was elected to the Canadian Agricultural Hall of Fame in 1988.

References

Notes

Citations

External links

 
 

1915 births
1990 deaths
Chancellors of the University of Guelph
Members of the Executive Council of Ontario
Politicians from London, Ontario
Progressive Conservative Party of Ontario MPPs